WGTK-FM (94.5 MHz) is a radio station licensed to serve Greenville, South Carolina. WGTK-FM is currently owned by the Salem Media Group, through licensee Salem Communications Holding Corporation.

History
Bob Jones University applied for an AM license in May 1948, and WMUU went on the air on September 15, 1949, at 1260 AM, programming sacred and classical music, dramatic readings, and evangelical Christian preaching. The call letters stood for "World's Most Unusual University," an early promotional slogan of BJU.  Bob Jones, Sr., the founder of BJU, intended the station to operate independently by accepting advertising rather than being supported by the university, but he did not expect the station to make a profit.

The AM station eventually increased its power from 1,000 to 5,000 watts. An FM station was added on August 15, 1960; and in 1965, it became the second stereo station in South Carolina.  In 1963, WMUU-FM became the most powerful station in South Carolina, radiating 100,000 watts and increasing its listening radius from fifty to a hundred miles.  Bob Jones University also bought WAVO in Atlanta but later sold it in order to focus its efforts on the Greenville station.

In 1973, the WMUU building on the BJU campus was demolished to build Founder's Memorial Amphitorium, completed in 1973. For several years, the studios were located in the FM transmitter building on Paris Mountain. WMUU AM & FM eventually moved to 920 Wade Hampton Boulevard, and BJU transferred ownership of the station to the Gospel Fellowship Association, its missionary arm, headquartered in the same building. WMUU became an independent corporation, although it maintained a close relationship with BJU, and most of its employees were graduates.

Many faculty members in the university's Fine Arts division participated in the station's early operation. For the first year, Bob Pratt served as a temporary manager. He was succeeded by James Ryerson who was station manager for nearly three decades.  Jim Dickson, who had earlier managed WAVO, became manager in 1979, and Paul Wright took his place in 1996.

Bob Jones University eventually made most of its beautiful and sacred music exclusive to WMUU-FM, using the AM station for preaching and some religious music.  Late in the 20th century, WMUU-AM independently carried mostly religious programming, although it did some simulcasting with the FM station.  In 2008, WMUU sold its AM station, which became WPJF, a station with a Spanish format.  Some of the programming heard on AM 1260 moved to WMUU-FM, airing late nights.

On August 24, 2012, Bob Jones III announced the sale of the station to Salem Communications, co-founded by BJU graduate Stuart Epperson, and the new owners introduced a conservative talk show format on December 3, 2012. The sale price listed with the FCC was $3 million ($1 million cash, $2 million in a promissory note).  In 2013, the older religious and beautiful music format continued to be available via internet streaming. On February 11, 2013, Salem Communications changed the call letters of the broadcast station to WGTK-FM.

HD radio
WGTK's HD2 channel broadcasts a Regional Mexican format branded as "Poder 102.9" (relayed on FM translator W275BJ Greenville). Until May 2016, this format was Lite 102.9 on HD2.
WGTK's HD3 channel broadcasts a soft adult contemporary format branded as "Lite-FM 96.9" (relayed on FM translator W245CH Greenville), previously Poder 96.9 was on HD2. On November 6, 2017, WGTK-HD3 changed its format to gospel, branded as "Rejoice 96.9".

References

Barbara Rumminger, "WMUU: Greenville's Unique Radio"

External links
Official website

GTK-FM
Salem Media Group properties
1960 establishments in South Carolina
Radio stations established in 1960
Talk radio stations in the United States
Conservative talk radio